The GE P30CH (nicknamed "Pooch" because of the similarity of the designation) was one of the first brand-new diesel-electric locomotives built for Amtrak by General Electric during Amtrak's early years.  The design was based on the GE U30C, but had a cowl carbody like its EMD competitors. Amtrak operated them between 1974 and 1992. 

The designation "P30CH" stood for the following: "P" for passenger service, "30" for the 3,000 horsepower V16 GE 7FDL diesel engine, "C" for C-C wheel arrangement, and "H" for head-end power.

Amtrak ordered 25 P30CHs in 1974, following up on its order of 40 EMD SDP40Fs in 1973. The P30CH was the first Amtrak diesel locomotive built from the factory to offer HEP (head end power) in the form of 2 Detroit Diesel generator sets, each rated at 375 kW for a combined total of 750 kW. The six-axle P30CHs, which cost Amtrak $480,000 each, were plagued with mechanical problems and were never very popular with crews or Amtrak management. In the mid-1970s Amtrak moved away from six-axle designs in favor of four-axle units; four-axle locomotives could better handle routes with numerous curves. Ultimately the four-axle EMD F40PHs quickly began to supersede the P30CHs soon after their introduction by Amtrak.

Amtrak leased fifteen to the Southern Pacific Railroad in 1978 for use on the Peninsula Commute between San Francisco and San Jose, California. Caltrans leased several P30CHs for its abortive Oxnard–Los Angeles "CalTrain" commuter service. In 1978, P30CH #713 was involved in a collision with some log trucks. In 1979 P30CH #715 was involved in a collision with an Illinois Central freight train. In the later years of their Amtrak careers, the locomotives were used regularly into the mid-1980s on the Sunset Limited and Auto Train routes. With the introduction of the Genesis series and the Dash 8-32BWH series, the P30CHs had their final runs in late 1991; (with one being sold off for use in safety tests) and all have been presumed scrapped.

Original owners
GE produced 25 P30CHs, all of which were delivered to Amtrak:

References

External links
 

Amtrak locomotives
P30CH
C-C locomotives
Passenger locomotives
Diesel-electric locomotives of the United States
Railway locomotives introduced in 1975
Scrapped locomotives
Standard gauge locomotives of the United States